Edward Patrick Johnson, CBE (22 August 187820 April 1959) was a Canadian operatic tenor who was billed outside North America as Edoardo Di Giovanni. He became general manager of the Metropolitan Opera in Manhattan, New York City from 1935 to 1950.

Early life 
Born in Guelph, Ontario, Canada, Johnson was the son of James Johnson and the former Margaret Jane Brown.  The young tenor sang in his local church choir and at events in the Guelph area. At a concert in Stratford, Ontario in 1897, contralto Edith Miller encouraged him to move to New York and pursue a singing career. He sang as a soloist with several church choirs in the New York area. After this period he did much concert work, touring through the Mid-West with the Chicago Symphony Orchestra and singing in many Music Festivals throughout the country. After a peripatetic existence for some years, working in a variety of venues and training with several masters, he made his concert debut at Carnegie Hall in 1904.

Johnson sang the lead role in the North American premiere of Oscar Straus's A Waltz Dream in 1907. In 1908 he moved to Paris, France and began training under Richard Barthélemy. He married Beatrice d'Arneiro, in London, in August 1909. His only child, Fiorenza, was born 21 December 1910. She married George Drew who later became Premier of Ontario and Federal Leader of the Opposition, and died in 1965.

Opera career

Johnson went to Italy in 1909, studying voice with Vincenzo Lombardi, in Florence. When singing outside North America, Johnson called himself Edoardo Di Giovanni. He made his opera debut on 10 January 1912 as Andrea Chénier at Padua's Teatro Verdi.  After his début in Padua, he became leading tenor at La Scala, Milan, for five consecutive seasons. In Rome he spent four seasons at the Costanzi Theatre, where, among other roles, he sang Luigi and Rinuccio in the Italian premiere of Il trittico. In 1914 he sang the title role in the first performance in Italian of Richard Wagner's Parsifal, under the baton of Arturo Toscanini. He sang in Madrid, Rio de Janeiro, and Buenos Aires. His London debut was in Gounod's Faust, alongside Nellie Melba.

Johnson made his North American opera debut on 20 November 1919 as Loris in Giordano's Fedora with the Chicago Opera.  He remained in Chicago for three years. Johnson made his Metropolitan Opera debut on 16 November 1922, as Avito in Italo Montemezzi's L'amore dei tre re. He remained with the Met for thirteen years as a singer. He notably created the title role in the world premiere of Deems Taylor's The King's Henchman in 1927. His last performance was on 20 March 1935.

As an opera director 
In May 1935, Johnson became general manager of the Metropolitan Opera, succeeding Herbert Witherspoon, who died just six weeks into his tenure. Johnson held the position for fifteen years. During this time, in 1943, he became a member of The Lambs.

Retirement 
Johnson retired from the Met on 15 June 1950 and was succeeded by Rudolf Bing. He returned to Guelph, promoting musical education and serving as chairman of the board of the Royal Conservatory of Music in Toronto. He established the Edward Johnson Music Foundation, sponsor of the annual Guelph Spring Festival.

He suffered a heart attack and died while attending a National Ballet recital at the Guelph Memorial Gardens.

Thoughts on singing
Not many rules
"If you get right down to the bottom, there are in reality not so many singing rules to learn. You sing on the five vowels, and when you can do them loudly, softly, and with mezzo voce, you have a foundation upon which to build vocal mastery. And yet some people study eight, ten years without really laying the foundation. Why should it take the singer such a long time to master the material of his equipment?  A lawyer or doctor, after leaving college, devotes three or four years only to preparing himself for his profession, receives his diploma, then sets up in business.  It ought not to be so much more difficult to learn to sing than to learn these other professions." Edward Johnson
The ear
"Of course the ear is the most important factor, our greatest ally. It helps us imitate. Imitation forms a large part of our study. We hear a beautiful tone; we try to imitate it; we try in various ways, with various placements, until we succeed in producing the sound we have been seeking. Then we endeavor to remember the sensations experienced in order that we may repeat the tone at will. So you see Listening, Imitation and Memory are very important factors in the student's development." Edward Johnson
Bel canto
"The old Italian operas cultivate the bel canto, that is—beautiful singing. Of course it is well for the singer to cultivate this first of all, for it is excellent, and necessary for the voice. But modern Italian opera portrays the real men and women of to-day, who live, enjoy, suffer, are angry and repentant. Bel canto will not express these emotions. When a man is jealous or in a rage, he will not stand quietly in the middle of the stage and sing beautiful tones." Edward Johnson
Interpretation
"I feel that if I have worked out a characterization, I must stick to my idea, in spite of what others say. It is my own conception, and I must either stand or fall by it. At times I have tried to follow the suggestions of this or that critic and have changed my interpretation to suit their taste. But it always rendered me self conscious, made my work unnatural and caused me speedily to return to my own conception." Edward Johnson

Honours and awards
The University of Toronto's Faculty of Music Building and Music Library were named in his honour and currently house his memorabilia.
The Edward Johnson Elementary School was opened in Guelph in 1955.
On 17 October 2006, Canada Post issued a set of five domestic rate (51¢) stamps to celebrate great Canadian opera singers, including Johnson.

Orders and decorations 
 Johnson was appointed a Commander of the Order of the British Empire (CBE) by King George V
Chevalier de la Légion d'honneur
Officer of the Crown of Italy, Order of the Star of Italian Solidarity
Commander of the Royal Swedish Order of Vasa
Brazilian Order of the Southern Cross

Honorary degrees 
 31 May 1929: Doctor of Laws (LL.D) – University of Western Ontario.
 1934: Doctor of Music (D.Mus.) – University of Toronto.
 1943: Doctor of Letters (D.Litt.) – Union College, New York.

References

Further reading

 McCready, Louise G. "Edward Johnson", in her Famous Musicians, in series, Canadian Portraits (Toronto: Clarke, Irwin & Co., 1957), p. [29]-67, ill. with sketched ports.

External links

The Edward Johnson Music Foundation (link via Internet Archive)
The Edward Johnson collection at the University of Guelph Library
 Edward Johnson collection at University of Toronto Music Library
History of the Tenor – Sound Clips and Narration

1878 births
1959 deaths
20th-century Canadian male opera singers
Canadian Commanders of the Order of the British Empire
Canadian operatic tenors
Metropolitan Opera people
Musicians from Guelph
Opera managers
Members of The Lambs Club
Persons of National Historic Significance (Canada)